Edward Langworthy may refer to:
Edward Langworthy (Founding Father), teacher, Founding Father and signer of the Articles of Confederation
Edward Langworthy (Iowa businessman), Iowa pioneer, businessman and territorial legislator
Edward Ryley Langworthy, British businessman and Liberal politician